The Eurosystem is the monetary authority of the eurozone, the collective of European Union member states that have adopted the euro as their sole official currency. The European Central Bank (ECB) has, under Article 16 of its Statute, the exclusive right to authorise the issuance of euro banknotes. Member states can issue euro coins, but the amount must be authorised by the ECB beforehand.

The Eurosystem consists of the ECB and the national central banks (NCB) of the 20 member states that are part of the eurozone. The national central banks apply the monetary policy of the ECB. The primary objective of the Eurosystem is price stability. Secondary objectives are financial stability and financial integration. The mission statement of the Eurosystem says that the ECB and the national central banks jointly contribute to achieving the objectives.

The Eurosystem is independent. When performing Eurosystem-related tasks, neither the ECB, nor an NCB, nor any member of their decision-making bodies may seek or take instructions from any external body. The Community institutions and bodies and the governments of the member states may not seek to influence the members of the decision-making bodies of the ECB or of the NCBs in the performance of their tasks.

The Eurosystem is distinct from the European System of Central Banks (ESCB), which comprises the ECB and the central banks of all  European Union member states, including those that are not part of the eurozone.

Functions
In accordance with the treaty establishing the European Community and the Statute of the European System of Central Banks and of the European Central Bank, the primary objective of the Eurosystem is to maintain price stability. Without prejudice to this objective, the Eurosystem supports the general economic policies in the Community and acts in accordance with the principles of an open market economy.

The basic tasks carried out by the Eurosystem are (art. 127 TFEU):
to define and implement the common monetary policy of the eurozone
to conduct foreign exchange operations
to hold and manage the official foreign reserves of the euro zone Member States, and
to promote the smooth operation of payment systems.

In addition, the Eurosystem contributes to the smooth conduct of policies pursued by the competent authorities relating to the prudential supervision of credit institutions and the stability of the financial system.

The ECB has an advisory role vis-à-vis the Community and national authorities on matters within its field of competence, particularly where Community or national legislation is concerned. The ECB, assisted by the NCBs, has the task of collecting the necessary statistical information either from the competent national authorities or directly from economic agents to enable the ESCB to perform its tasks.

Current members

See also

TARGET2, the real-time gross settlement system (RTGS) owned and operated by the Eurosystem.

References

External links
ECB – Eurosystem – Governing Council
ECB – Eurosystem – Executive Board
List of Eurosystem central banks' websites
The Payment System

 
Eurozone